Clarismario Santos Rodrigues (born 27 July 2001) is a Brazilian professional footballer who plays as a left winger for Bosnian Premier League club Željezničar.

Club career

Rudar Prijedor
In January 2021, Santos signed for Bosnian club Rudar Prijedor. He made his debut in a 2–1 loss against Željezničar Banja Luka on 6 March 2021. He left the club in June 2022.

Željezničar
On 8 June 2022, Santos signed for Bosnian Premier League club Željezničar. He made his debut in a 1–1 draw against Leotar on 16 July 2022. He scored his first goal for the club in a league game against Široki Brijeg on 31 July.

Career statistics

Club

Honours
Rudar Prijedor
First League of RS: 2020–21

References

External links
Clarismario Santos at Sofascore

2001 births
Living people
Sportspeople from Bahia
Brazilian footballers
Brazilian expatriate footballers
Brazilian expatriate sportspeople in Croatia
Brazilian expatriate sportspeople in Bosnia and Herzegovina
Expatriate footballers in Croatia
Expatriate footballers in Bosnia and Herzegovina
Association football wingers
Fluminense de Feira Futebol Clube players
NK Dubrava players
FK Rudar Prijedor players
FK Željezničar Sarajevo players
Second Football League (Croatia) players
First League of the Republika Srpska players
Premier League of Bosnia and Herzegovina players